Hubert Raudaschl (born 26 August 1942 in Sankt Gilgen am Wolfgangsee) is an Austrian sailboat manufacturer and former Olympic athlete.  He has participated in nine Olympic games between 1964 and 1996.  Raudaschl has competed in the second most Olympic Games, behind Canadian Ian Millar and tied with Soviet/Latvian Afanasijs Kuzmins.

Raudaschl has won two olympic silver medals, one in Mexico City in 1968 in Finn sailing, the other one in Moscow in 1980 in Star sailing.

He is a two time World Champion (in 1964 in Finn sailing, and in 1978 in Microcupper sailing) and is a five time European Champion.

See also 
 List of athletes with the most appearances at Olympic Games

References
 Austrian Olympic Committee

External links
 

1942 births
Living people
Austrian male sailors (sport)
Boat builders
Sailmakers
People from Salzburg-Umgebung District
Sportspeople from Salzburg (state)

Olympic sailors of Austria
Olympic silver medalists for Austria
Olympic medalists in sailing
Medalists at the 1980 Summer Olympics
Medalists at the 1968 Summer Olympics
Sailors at the 1964 Summer Olympics – Finn
Sailors at the 1968 Summer Olympics – Finn
Sailors at the 1972 Summer Olympics – Tempest
Sailors at the 1976 Summer Olympics – Soling
Sailors at the 1980 Summer Olympics – Star
Sailors at the 1984 Summer Olympics – Star
Sailors at the 1988 Summer Olympics – Star
Sailors at the 1992 Summer Olympics – Star
Sailors at the 1996 Summer Olympics – Star

Finn class world champions
World champions in sailing for Austria